Donaggio is a surname. Notable people with the surname include: 

Arturo Donaggio (1868–1942), Italian physician
Leonardo Donaggio (born 2003), Italian freestyle skier
Pino Donaggio (born 1941), Italian musician, singer, and composer

Italian-language surnames